The 2009 Victoria Cup was the second edition of the Victoria Cup challenge, played on September 29, 2009 between the 2008–09 Champions Hockey League winner ZSC Lions and the Chicago Blackhawks of the National Hockey League (NHL). The ZSC Lions won the game 2–1.

ZSC Lions
The ZSC Lions qualified to play for the 2009 Victoria Cup by winning the 2008–09 Champions Hockey League competition. The ZSC Lions from Switzerland won the competition by beating Russia's Metallurg Magnitogorsk in the finals. Metallurg Magnitogorsk played in the inaugural 2008 Victoria Cup game.

Chicago Blackhawks
The Chicago Blackhawks were named on May 10, 2009 to represent the NHL. The Blackhawks made it to the Western Conference Finals in 2008, eventually losing to the Detroit Red Wings. They would go on in the 2009 season to clinch the 2nd seed in the Western Conference and win the Stanley Cup for the first time since 1961. The Chicago Blackhawks were founded in 1926 and are one of the "Original Six" teams of the NHL. This was the Blackhawks' first game against a European club in Europe. The Blackhawks have played in Europe before, having played two exhibition games in 1992 in London, England against the NHL Montreal Canadiens. The Blackhawks played an exhibition game at Hallenstadion on September 28 against HC Davos, which they won 9 - 2.

Game summary

Scoring summary

Penalty summary

Team rosters

 Lukas Flueler dressed for the ZSC Lions as the back-up goalie and did not enter the game.   Antti Niemi dressed for the Chicago Blackhawks as the back-up goalie and did not enter the game.

Source ZSC Lions,  Chicago Blackhawks

Officials 
 Referees -  Vyacheslav Bulanov,  Daniel Marouelli
 Linesmen -  Frantisek Kalovoda, Tim Nowak

Notes

External links
 Victoria Cup website

Victoria Cup (ice hockey)
2009–10 in European ice hockey
2009
2009–10 NHL season
2009–10 in Swiss ice hockey